Hara horai is a species of South Asian river catfish endemic to West Bengal, India where it is found in the Terai and Duars in the middle and upper Brahmaputra River drainage. This species grows to a length of  TL.

References

Erethistidae
Endemic fauna of India
Freshwater fish of India
Taxa named by Kamla Sankar Misra
Fish described in 1976